The 9A Qadr is an Iranian surface to ground precision-guided munition (PGM). It is Iran's first generation of air-launched bomb. It was developed by the missile-manufacturing companies of the Iranian Ministry of Defence, not the well-established Aerospace Industries Organisation, who build Iran surface-to-surface guided weapons. 

The GBU-67/9A Qadr is an unpowered Electro-Optically guided Glide-Bomb (EO GB), built around a 2,000 lb Mk 84 class bomb body. Both the Qadr and the Zoobin have been designed around standard US-pattern general-purpose bomb shapes, from existing IRIAF stocks. Both weapons have also been given US-style `GBU' and `AGM' designations, although the designers say that these numbers have no greater significance beyond inventory management and parts stocks.

Operators

 Islamic Republic of Iran Air Force

See also
Military of Iran
Iranian military industry
Current Equipment of the Iranian Army
Historical Equipment of the Iranian Army

References

Islamic Republic of Iran Army
Aerial bombs of Iran
Guided bombs
Military equipment introduced in the 2000s